Ilasco is an unincorporated community in Ralls County, in the U.S. state of Missouri.

History
Ilasco had its start as a cement factory company town; the name Ilasco is an acronym of cement components, namely iron, lime, aluminum, silica, carbon, and oxygen. A post office called Ilasco was established in 1919, and remained in operation until 1960.

The Ilasco Historic District was listed on the National Register of Historic Places in 2016.

Notable person
Gregg Andrews, an historian, published author, and musician, was raised in Ilasco.

References

Unincorporated communities in Ralls County, Missouri
Unincorporated communities in Missouri